Lucky and Flo are a pair of black Labrador Retrievers trained by Dr. Neil Powell, notable for being the first animals trained to detect optical discs by scent.  They are sponsored by the Motion Picture Association of America (MPAA) and Federation Against Copyright Theft (FACT) as part of an initiative to combat copyright infringement of film DVDs.

Although the dogs are sponsored and publicized on the premise that they can detect counterfeit DVDs, they have no ability to distinguish between counterfeit DVDs and any other polycarbonate optical disc. The dogs' abilities were first demonstrated in May 2006 at the FedEx shipping hub at London Stansted Airport, though inspectors found all the discs the dogs detected that day to be legitimate.  Another demonstration was held at the MPAA's Washington, D.C. office on September 26, 2006. In March 2007 the two dogs were sent to Malaysia to help sniff out DVDs. After a raid on a bootleg DVD ring in Johor Bahru on March 20, reports said that the dogs were now targeted by the DVD pirates and that a bounty had been put on their heads.

In March 2008 the MPAA, along with children's magazine the Weekly Reader, released a curriculum for grades 5 to 7 featuring Lucky and Flo to be distributed to nearly 60,000 classrooms in 20,000 schools across 10 U.S. states and designed to "educate children about the importance of respecting copyrights while presenting it in a fun and exciting way," according to then-MPAA chairman and CEO Dan Glickman. Glickman lavished praise on the canines, saying that the dogs "are some of the greatest employees we have here at the MPAA".

See also 
 Working dog
 List of Labradors
 List of individual dogs

References 

Copyright enforcement
Motion Picture Association
Individual dogs in the United States
Detection dogs